Milanese J. "Mike" Gulian (Marash, July 29, 1900 – Newton, Massachusetts, January 10, 1970), sometimes known as the Armenian Prince, was an Ottoman Empire-born player of American football.  He was a first-team All-American in 1922 and subsequently played five seasons in the National Football League (NFL) from 1923 to 1927.  He was the first Armenian-born player in the league.

Gulian was born in Marash in Western Armenia then part of Ottoman Empire, immigrated to the United States at a young age, and grew up in Newton, Massachusetts.

Gulian played college football at the tackle position for the Brown Bears football team and was captain of Brown's 1922 team. His play was reported to have been largely responsible for Brown's 3–0 victory over Harvard in 1922.  He was selected by Athletic World magazine, Billy Evans, Lawrence Perry and the  Romelke Press Clipping Bureau as a first-team tackle on the 1922 College Football All-America Team. His total of 97 votes in the Romelke poll was the fifth highest that year.

Gulian also played five seasons in the NFL for the Buffalo All-Americans (1923), Frankford Yellow Jackets (1924), and Providence Steam Roller (1925–1927). He was the first Armenian-born player in the NFL. He is distinguished as being the first Armenian to play in the National Football League.

After retiring from football, Gulian worked for the Equitable Life Assurance Company in Boston. During World War II, he served in the United States Army for 10 months and then with the American Red Cross in India for three years. Gulian died in 1970 at his home in Newton, Massachusetts.

References

1900 births
1970 deaths
People from Kahramanmaraş
American football tackles
United States Army personnel of World War II
Armenian players of American football
Brown Bears football players
Buffalo All-Americans players
Frankford Yellow Jackets players
Providence Steam Roller players
Sportspeople from Newton, Massachusetts
Players of American football from Massachusetts
Emigrants from the Ottoman Empire to the United States
Armenians from the Ottoman Empire
Newton North High School alumni
Armenian American
American Red Cross personnel